Henry Sherwood (January 27, 1824 – July 23, 1875) was an American lawyer and politician from New York.

Life
He was the son of Micajah Sherwood, and was born in that part of the Town of Troupsburg which was separated in 1828 to form the Town of Woodhull, in Steuben County, New York. He studied law with Ferral C. Dininny, was admitted to the bar in 1852, and practiced. In 1855, he married Eleanor Robinson.

He was a member of the New York State Assembly (Steuben Co., 2nd D.) in 1862 and 1863. In 1863, he was the Republican candidate for Speaker of the New York State Assembly, but due to a deadlocked assembly, he withdrew from the contest after the 78th ballot. Eventually, Democrat Theophilus C. Callicot was elected by the Republicans on the 92nd ballot.

Later he was a director of the Erie Railroad.

He died at his home in Corning.

Sources
 The New York Civil List compiled by Franklin Benjamin Hough, Stephen C. Hutchins and Edgar Albert Werner (1870; pg. 497 and 499)
 Biographical Sketches of the State Officers and the Members of the Legislature of the State of New York in 1862 and '63 by William D. Murphy (1863; pg. 399f)
 Obit transcribed from the New York Herald on July 24, 1875
 HON. HENRY SHERWOOD, obit in NYT on July 24, 1875

1824 births
1875 deaths
People from Woodhull, New York
Republican Party members of the New York State Assembly
19th-century American railroad executives
Politicians from Corning, New York
19th-century American politicians